Karel Schmuck (born 29 December 1913, date of death unknown) was a Czech water polo player. He competed in the men's tournament at the 1936 Summer Olympics.

References

External links
 

1913 births
Year of death missing
Czechoslovak male water polo players
Olympic water polo players of Czechoslovakia
Water polo players at the 1936 Summer Olympics
Place of birth missing